Anastasia Vasilyevna Martiusheva (born 17 March 1995) is a Russian pair skater. With Alexei Rogonov, she is the 2012 Ondrej Nepela Memorial champion, a two-time (2010, 2011) Golden Spin of Zagreb champion, and the 2009 World Junior silver medalist. They are the 2012 Russian national senior bronze medalists and 2009 junior champions.

Career 
Martiusheva began skating at the age of five-and-a-half. Initially a singles skater, she switched to pair skating at age ten.

Partnership with Rogonov 

Martiusheva and Alexei Rogonov first met in Perm, skating in the same group but with different partners. After she relocated to Moscow and he made the same journey six months later, Natalia Pavlova paired them together, in 2006. The pair won the 2009 Russian Junior title. At the 2009 World Junior Championships, they were 11th after the short program but finished first in the long program, ahead of Lubov Iliushechkina / Nodari Maisuradze. They moved up to second overall and took the silver medal.

Martiusheva/Rogonov made their senior Grand Prix debut at the 2009 Cup of Russia, where they finished seventh. They finished 9th at Russian Nationals. During the 2010–11 season, they were assigned to 2010 Skate Canada International but withdrew from the event. They won the 2010 Golden Spin of Zagreb. At the 2011 Russian Nationals, they placed 9th in the short program and 7th in the long, to finish 9th overall.

During the 2011–12 season, Martiusheva/Rogonov won the 2011 Golden Spin of Zagreb and Warsaw Cup. At the 2012 Russian Nationals, they placed second in the short program and third in the free skate and won the bronze medal.

In the 2012–13 season, Martiusheva/Rogonov won gold at the 2012 Ondrej Nepela Memorial. They competed on the Grand Prix series for the first time since 2009, finishing 5th at both of their events, the 2012 Rostelecom Cup and the 2012 NHK Trophy. They set their personal best overall score of 162.25 points. They finished 6th at the 2013 Russian Championships.

In 2013–14, Martiusheva/Rogonov began their season by taking silver at the Lombardia Trophy, followed by another silver at the 2013 Ondrej Nepela Trophy. They were seventh at their first Grand Prix assignment, the 2013 Cup of China. A week later, the pair replaced the injured Yuko Kavaguti / Alexander Smirnov at the 2013 NHK Trophy. Two days before the 2014 Russian Championships, Martiusheva injured a leg muscle in a bad fall and doctors ordered the pair to withdraw. The partnership ended soon after.

In January 2014, Martiusheva began searching for a new partner. In June 2014, she tried out with Alexander Korovin.

Programs 
(with Rogonov)

Competitive highlights 
(with Rogonov)

References

External links 

 
 Anastasia Martiusheva / Alexei Rogonov at sport-folio.net
 Anastasia Martiusheva at fskate.ru 

Russian female pair skaters
Living people
1995 births
Sportspeople from Perm, Russia
World Junior Figure Skating Championships medalists